River of Grass is a 1994 American drama film directed by Kelly Reichardt in her feature film directorial debut. Reichardt wrote the screenplay from a story by her and Jesse Hartman. It was selected for the Sundance Film Festival and the Berlin International Film Festival, and was nominated for the Sundance Grand Jury Prize and four Independent Spirit Awards.

The film is set in the Broward and Dade Counties of Florida, between Miami and the Everglades (nicknamed "the River of Grass"). The story concerns a local couple who attempt to flee South Florida after their involvement in a shooting incident, but lack the money to get away.

Plot
Cozy is a dissatisfied housewife in her thirties who feels no emotional connection with her children. After getting dressed up to go to a bar she is nearly run over by Lee. Inside, Lee buys Cozy a drink. He convinces her to break into a friend's home where they swim in a pool and Lee shows Cozy the gun that he was given by a friend who found it by the side of the road. While Lee shows Cozy how to use the gun the owner of the pool comes out to investigate and the gun goes off. Believing they have killed the man Cozy and Lee go on the run together.

Themes and conception
Reichardt grew up in the part of Florida the film depicts. She has described the film as "[a] road movie without the road, a love story without the love, and a crime story without the crime."  Her subsequent films, such as Wendy and Lucy and Meek's Cutoff, involve similar themes, of people trying to leave a place but frustrated by their lack of resources.  Of that theme, Reichardt said, "I guess it's just a good setup for different kinds of searching: question-asking, looking for the next place to go, what are you looking for, what are you leaving. All those things are good for grounding it in getting from point A to point B."

Festivals and theatrical release
River of Grass debuted in competition at the Sundance Film Festival in January 1994, and then played at the Berlin International Film Festival in February 1994. Its theatrical debut was in New York City at The Public Theater on August 4, 1995, which was followed by a limited release in the U.S. on October 13, 1995. It was shown at the Buenos Aires International Festival of Independent Cinema on March 30, 2009.

Re-release
In January 2015, distributor Oscilloscope Laboratories launched a Kickstarter in order to digitally restore the film. In December of that year the Sundance Film Festival announced that they would be showing a special screening of the film at the 2016 Sundance Film Festival. A limited theatrical re-release was planned for March 2016.

Critical reception
The New York Times film critic Stephen Holden described River of Grass as having "the look and feel of a sophisticated home movie featuring everyday people instead of actors."  He praised the film's evocation of "a sense of suffocating ennui," but criticized the story as too "sketchily told" and the dialogue as too "fragmentary" for the film to cohere.

Accolades

References

External links

Films directed by Kelly Reichardt
Films set in Florida
Films shot in Florida
1994 films
1994 drama films
American drama films
1994 directorial debut films
1994 independent films
American independent films
1990s American films
1990s English-language films